Growing Up is a Philippine television drama series broadcast by GMA Network. The series served as a sequel to the Philippine television series T.G.I.S. Directed by Mark A. Reyes, it stars Angelu de Leon, Bobby Andrews and Onemig Bondoc. It premiered on June 2, 1997. The series concluded on February 12, 1999, with a total of 88 episodes.

Cast and characters

 Angelu de Leon as Ma. Patrice "Peachy" Real
 Bobby Andrews as Joaquin "Wacks" Torres III
 Onemig Bondoc as Jose Mari "JM" Rodriguez
 Red Sternberg as Francisco Martin "Kiko" Arboleda de Dios
 Michael Flores as Miguel "Mickey" Ledesma
 Donna Cruz as Stephanie Enriquez
 Jake Roxas as Noel Sta. Maria
 Raven Villanueva as Cristina "Cris" de Guzman
 Rica Peralejo as Michelle "Mitch" Ferrer
 Ciara Sotto as Regina "Rain" Abrera
 Mariel Lopez as Angel Buena
 Diego Castro as Anton Villanueva
 Bernadette Allyson as Beatrice Santillan
 Ryan Eigenmann as Iñigo Escaler Torres
 Lindsay Custodio as Melissa Valenzuela

References

External links
 

1997 Philippine television series debuts
1999 Philippine television series endings
Filipino-language television shows
GMA Network drama series
Philippine teen drama television series
Television series about teenagers
Television series by Viva Television
Television shows set in Manila